Ein Herz und eine Seele (literally "One Heart and One Soul" i.e. "hand in glove") is a German television sitcom based on the British sitcom Till Death Us Do Part by Johnny Speight. The show premiered on 15 January 1973 and lasted for about twenty episodes, airing its last on 4 November 1974. In 1976 the show had a short-lived revival with another four episodes. Ein Herz und eine Seele was written by Wolfgang Menge.

The show was extremely successful during its initial run and it still proves very popular in reruns. Two episodes in particular, Sylvesterpunsch (about the family's New Year's Eve party) and Rosenmontagszug (set during the winter carnival season) have gained such popularity that they are now shown traditionally on German TV on New Year's Eve and Rosenmontag, respectively.

Storyline
The show reflects the life of a petty bourgeois family in West German Wattenscheid, characterised by the social climate of the Willy Brandt era and its political upheavals initiated by the German student movement of 1968. Ein Herz und eine Seele makes intensive use of references to German politics and social issues of the early and mid-1970s, when Germany was still divided, not just between East and West, but also (in the case of West Germany) between liberals and conservatives. To feature these tensions in a TV series broke new ground at that time.

The undisputed star is Ekel ("creep") Alfred Tetzlaff (Heinz Schubert), commercial clerk, a born Sudeten German, Bild reader and reactionary patriarch, who is constantly arguing with his wife Else, his daughter Rita, and his son-in-law Michael. He is a declared foe of the SPD government ruining the country only to sell it to the Mongols, of foreigners, Gastarbeiter, Jews and the women's movement. During his term of service in the Wehrmacht he had spent time in Paris, which finds expression in his (dubious) language skills. Alfred's appearance, small in physique with a moustache and side-parted hair, along with his passionate politicking with a high-pitched voice and frequent hand movements, make his character somewhat reminiscent of Adolf Hitler. Raised in Berlin he is a dedicated fan of Hertha BSC, which makes life somewhat hard in the Ruhr area.

Alfred is married (afflicted) with Else, a housewife from Elmshorn, whose fatuity constantly drives him mad. She ceaselessly speaks up, confusing Pompidou with Pompadour and Kiesinger with Kissinger, honestly astonished that the Germans had elected a Jewish chancellor. (In this sense, although the German Else was named after the British version of the character, the quiet but sometimes snarky Else Garnett, the character more closely resembled Edith Bunker from the American version of the show, All in the Family.) Ironically, Alfred's use of "dusselige Kuh", literally "silly cow", as a nickname for Else was not allowed in the BBC original: the British character Alf Garnett had to refer to his wife as a "silly moo".

The young couple, Rita and her husband Michael, cannot afford an apartment and live in Rita's child's room. Michael is a supporter of Chancellor Willy Brandt and moreover was raised in East Germany, which arouses Alfred's suspicion of him being a Komsomol, a Bolshevik hyena and an anarchist. Michael's parents still live in East Germany; as retirees they are allowed to visit their son and his new family in the episode Besuch aus der Ostzone ("Visit from the Eastern Zone"), an episode which exists both in black-and-white and colour and is usually aired on German Unity Day.

Broadcast
The show was originally broadcast in black and white and shown on the regional channel of the North Rhine-Westphalia area, WDR. It moved to West Germany's first channel, ARD, on New Year's Eve 1973 with the above-mentioned episode and from that date was produced in colour. Some of the colour episodes are actually remakes or reprises of older black-and-white episodes. The first series is considered to consist of 21 episodes. 

For the second series, Elisabeth Wiedemann, popular in her role as Else Tetzlaff, was replaced by Helga Feddersen and Michael, formerly played by Diether Krebs, was portrayed by Klaus Dahlen. Whereas the original actors portrayed stereotypical but believable characters, Feddersen and Dahlen turned their roles into purely comedic characters, introducing slapstick. The audience clearly did not approve of these changes: after only four episodes of the second series, Ein Herz und eine Seele was cancelled. 

According to the BBC website, the series was not popular due to the reactionary politics of its lead character.  Yet the series, despite its polarization and abusive language, was very popular with up to 15.7 million viewers. It declined in the ratings due to the cast changes in the second series. In 2002, a survey showed the program was Germany's most popular sitcom of all time.

In 2004 the complete series was released to DVD and was a best seller.

Episodes 
Episodes 1 to 11 were broadcast in black and white, the rest were broadcast in colour.

Season 1 (1973/1974)

Season 2 (1976)

See also
 German television comedy

External links
A survey of the first 20 episodes (in German)

1973 German television series debuts
1976 German television series endings
German-language television shows
German comedy television series
New Year's television specials
German television series based on British television series
Till Death Us Do Part
Das Erste original programming